Julio César Uribe Flores (born May 9, 1958 in Lima, Peru) is a Peruvian football manager and former player who played as an attacking midfielder or a second striker. He is the current manager of Alianza Universidad.

Playing career

Club
Uribe started his career with Peruvian club Sporting Cristal. Then he joined Italian club Cagliari Calcio for three seasons. After his time in Italy, Uribe returned to Sporting Cristal. He then played the following seasons with several clubs in Colombia and Mexico such as Club América. He returned to Peru in his last season as footballer to retire with C.A. Mannucci in 1992.

International
During his playing days, from 1979 to 1989, he earned 39 caps and scored 9 goals for the Peruvian national team and played in the 1982 FIFA World Cup.

Managerial career

Peru's National Soccer Team Coach
In 2007, he was appointed as Peru's coach, his second stint in charge as he was also the coach from 2000 to 2001.  Previous to being head coach of Peru's national team, he was team coach of Cienciano del Cuzco.

On June 3, 2007, under Julio César Uribe's management, Peru had a friendly football match against Ecuador in Madrid, Spain. Peru defeated Ecuador 2-1  still giving Peru a victory over Ecuador repeatedly for over  8 years. A second friendly on June 7 was played in Barcelona, and Ecuador defeated the Peruvian team 2-0 (Both goals scored near the end of the game). Even though most agreed Peru played the better game, the saying that football matches are won by goals rather than "pretty play" was proven once more.

Uribe's next task at hand was the Copa América 2007.  He was criticized for calling up a younger and somewhat more experimental squad.  Nolberto Solano, a key midfielder, held his state of retirement.  Peru started off on the right foot, beating Uruguay 3-0 in their opening match.  However, they were not able to define in goal scoring opportunities or overcome controversial refereeing decisions in their 2-0 loss to hosts Venezuela.  The surprisingly young and nimble Bolivian team also seemed on the way to beating Peru, however 2 Claudio Pizarro headers salvaged a tie for Peru.  With the tie, Peru advanced into the quarter finals, but not without a scare.  In the quarter finals against Argentina, they were overcome by 4 second half goals after being tied 0-0 at Halftime.  Uribe was criticized for unstable formations and inadequate planning, as well as giving Argentina too much space and respect. Uribe was heavily criticized for his game planning, however Peru showed true promise against Uruguay and progress was seen under Uribe, the Copa marked what could be the beginning of a new era in Peruvian football, as they enter the South Africa 2010 qualifiers with high expectations.

Following poor results in the Copa, Uribe was fired and replaced by José del Solar in the week of July 22, 2007

Honours

Playing career
Peruvian League: 4
 1979, 1980, 1988, 1991

Mexican Primera División: 1
 1987-88

References

External links

1958 births
Living people
Footballers from Lima
Association football midfielders
Peruvian footballers
Peru international footballers
Peruvian Primera División players
Sporting Cristal footballers
Cagliari Calcio players
Atlético Junior footballers
América de Cali footballers
Club América footballers
Tecos F.C. footballers
Independiente Medellín footballers
Envigado F.C. players
Peruvian expatriate footballers
Expatriate footballers in Italy
Expatriate footballers in Colombia
Expatriate footballers in Mexico
Peruvian expatriate sportspeople in Colombia
Peruvian expatriate sportspeople in Mexico
1982 FIFA World Cup players
1987 Copa América players
1989 Copa América players
Categoría Primera A players
Serie A players
Serie B players
Liga MX players
Peruvian football managers
Peruvian Primera División managers
Deportivo Municipal managers
Club Alianza Lima managers
Tecos F.C. managers
Atlético Junior managers
Juan Aurich managers
Peru national football team managers
Cienciano managers
José Gálvez FBC managers
Universidad San Martín managers
2001 Copa América managers
2007 Copa América managers
Peruvian expatriate football managers
Expatriate football managers in China
Expatriate football managers in Mexico
Expatriate football managers in Colombia
Peruvian expatriate sportspeople in China
Unión Comercio managers
Club San José managers
Carlos A. Mannucci managers